Barbus bergi, the Bulgarian barbel, is a species of ray-finned fish in the genus Barbus.

References 

 

bergi
Freshwater fish of Europe
Fish described in 1935